The Next Indian general election  will be held by 2024 to constitute the 18th Lok Sabha.

Party-wise results summary

Results- Constituency wise

References

Gujarat
Indian general elections in Gujarat